Lyudmila Petrovna Senchina (13 January 1948 or 13 December 1950, – 25 January 2018) was a Soviet and Russian singer (soprano). In 1979 she was awarded the title of Meritorious Artist of the RSFSR and in 2002 the title of People's Artist of Russia. Merited Artist of Ukraine (2003). She made popular such songs as Cinderella,  Stones ,  Love and Separation ,  White Acacia ,  Birthday ,  White Dance ,  Field Flowers .

Senchina also acted in several movies. Her most famous film was Armed and Dangerous'', in which she played the lead female role.

Senchina died on January 25, 2018, in a hospital in St. Petersburg after a long illness.

References

External links 
 
 10 песен, по которым будут помнить Людмилу Сенчину

1950 births
2018 deaths
People from Mykolaiv Oblast
Soviet women singers
Russian sopranos
Russian actresses
Soviet actresses
Honored Artists of the RSFSR
Recipients of the title of Merited Artist of Ukraine
Singers from Saint Petersburg
20th-century Russian women singers
20th-century Russian singers
People's Artists of Russia
Soviet sopranos
21st-century Russian women singers
21st-century Russian singers
Russian people of Ukrainian descent
Actresses from Saint Petersburg
Deaths from pancreatic cancer
Deaths from cancer in Russia
Ukrainian Romani people